Dan Jones International Airport  is a public-use airport in unincorporated Harris County, Texas, United States that is privately owned by Daniel Jones of Cypress.

Facilities and aircraft 
It has one runway designated 17/35 with a 3,440 by 50 ft (1,049 x 15 m) asphalt and turf surface. For the 12-month period ending May 20, 2008, the airport had 7,800 aircraft operations, an average of 21 per day, all of which were general aviation. At that time there were 18 aircraft based at this airport: 94% single-engine and 6% multi-engine.

References

External links 
 CFI Certification and Recertification Educators
 
 

Airports in Harris County, Texas